Milja Reinert Simonsen (born 11 January 1997) is a Faroese football forward who currently plays for Havnar Bóltfelag.

Honours 
Havnar Bóltfelag
Runners-up
 Faroese Women's Cup: 2014

International goals
Scores and results list Faroe Islands' goal tally first.

External links 
 

1997 births
Living people
People from Tórshavn
Faroese women's footballers
Faroe Islands women's international footballers
Faroe Islands women's youth international footballers
Women's association football forwards
Havnar Bóltfelag players